Modus Vivendi is an album by Swedish heavy metal band Tad Morose released on the Century Media label in 2003.

Track listing
All tracks arranged by Tad Morose; lyrics, melodies and vocal arrangements by Urban Breed.

"Anubis"
"No Mercy"
"Afraid to Die"
"Clearly Insane"
"Cyberdome"
"Take on the World"
"Mother Shipton's Words"
"Unwelcome Guest"
"Life in a Lonely Grave"
"When the Spirit Rules the World"

Japanese bonus tracks
Knowing Me Knowing You (ABBA cover)
Rainbow Demon (Uriah Heep cover)
Losing More Than You Ever Had (Accept cover)

Personnel
 Urban Breed – vocals, vocoder, keyboards
 Christer "Krunt" Andersson – guitars
 Daniel Olsson – guitars, bass, keyboards
 Anders Modd – bass
 Peter Morén – drums
 Stefan Zell – backing vocals

Additional information
Additional recordings at the Frop Farm, Flaxenbo, Sweden
Engineer: Per Ryberg
Mixed by Fredrik Nordström & Patrik Steen
Mixed at Studio Fredman, Gothenburg, Sweden
Cover artwork and layout: Jan Meininghaus
Mastering: Ulf Horbelt @ DMS, Marl, Germany
Photography: Håkon Grav

References

External links
 Tad Morose, official Site

Tad Morose albums
2003 albums